The Eti Soda Inc. is a chemical industry company in Ankara 
Province, Turkey producing natural soda ash and baking soda from trona. It was founded in 1998, and the production started in 2009. The company's main shareholder is Ciner Group.

Background
Exploration works for trona ore reserve continued until 1985. According to world's leading consulting firms, mining of the trona ore at Bypazarı was not feasible with known methods. The state-owned mining company Eti Maden and the privately held Ciner Holding jointly took a risk and  developed solution mining method for extraction of trona ore. The method, which was new in the world, has been then patented. In 1998, the Eti Soda Inc. was established in Ankara. The building of the soda production and cogeneration plants were completed between 2007 and 2009.

The production of soda ash started with an official inauguration ceremony, which  took place in presence of Prime minister Recep Tayyip Erdoğan and Minister of Energy and Natural Resources Hilmi Güler in March 2009.

The Eti Soda Inc. is jointly owned in majority by Ciner Holding with 74% and by Eti Maden with 26%.

Plant and production
Trona ore is extracted by solution mining method. Hot water is injected into the trona ore deposit underground through bore holes drilled, which dissolves trona ore. The trona solution is pumped up and is processed to soda products as soda ash (sodium carbonate, Na2CO3) and baking soda (sodium bicarbonate, NaHCO3). The soda ash is mainly used in the glass production. Products of Eti Soda are exported all over the world, especially to European countries. From 2009 to 2013, the value of soda ash exports to 53 countries reached US$1 billion.

The annual production capacity of the Eti Soda facilities is one million tons of soda ash and 100,000 tons of baking soda. In 2010, already in its first year of the operation, the company fulfilled its production capacity.

There is a 20 MW cogeneration coal-fired power station.

See also

Ciner Wyoming, United States
Kazan Soda Elektrik, Turkey

References

Ciner Glass and Chemicals Group
Mining companies of Turkey
Chemical companies of Turkey
Chemical plants
Industrial buildings in Turkey
Industrial buildings completed in 2009
Chemical companies established in 1998
Non-renewable resource companies established in 1998
Turkish companies established in 1998
Companies based in Ankara
Beypazarı, Ankara
21st-century architecture in Turkey